W. grandis may refer to:
 Walckenaeria grandis, a spider species in the genus Walckenaeria found in the Azores
 Wellnhoferia grandis, an early prehistoric bird species found in Germany that lived during the Late Jurassic

See also
 Grandis (disambiguation)